Andy Frye  (born c. 1959) is an American football coach and former coach of wrestling and track and field. He is the head football coach at Centre College in Danville, Kentucky, a position he has held since the 1998 season.

Biography 
A native of Westerville, Ohio, Frye attended Muskingum College—now known as Muskingum University—in New Concord, Ohio, where he played football, was team captain as a senior in 1980, and graduated in 1981. He earned a master's degree at Ohio University in Athens, Ohio before returning to Muskingum as head wrestling coach and assistant football coach in 1985. In 1987, Frye was named the Ohio Athletic Conference (OAC) Wrestling Coach of the Year.

Frye joined the coaching staff at Centre in 1989 as head coach in track and field and an assistant in football under Joe McDaniel. He succeeded McDaniel as head football coach after the 1997 season.

Head coaching record

Football

References

External links
 Centre profile

Year of birth missing (living people)
1950s births
Living people
American football defensive tackles
American football linebackers
Centre Colonels football coaches
Defiance Yellow Jackets football coaches
Muskingum Fighting Muskies football coaches
Muskingum Fighting Muskies football players
Ohio Bobcats football coaches
College track and field coaches in the United States
College wrestling coaches in the United States
People from Westerville, Ohio
Coaches of American football from Ohio
Players of American football from Ohio